Zaur Kabaloev (born 2 June 1992) is a Russian, then Italian Greco-Roman wrestler. In 2019, he won the gold medal in the men's 67 kg event at the 2019 European Games held in Minsk, Belarus. In the final, he defeated Shmagi Bolkvadze of Georgia.

In 2018, he won one of the bronze medals in the men's 63 kg event at the 2018 European Wrestling Championships held in Kaspiysk, Russia.

Major results

References

External links 
 

Living people
1992 births
Place of birth missing (living people)
Italian male sport wrestlers
Russian male sport wrestlers
Wrestlers at the 2019 European Games
European Games gold medalists for Russia
European Games medalists in wrestling
European Wrestling Championships medalists